Journey to the Magic Isle is a 1989 role-playing game supplement for Rolemaster published by Iron Crown Enterprises.

Contents
Journey to the Magic Isle is a supplement in which the setting is an island near a treacherous Essence flow.

Publication history
Journey to the Magic Isle was written by Timothy Taylor, with a cover by Tony Roberts, and illustrations by Harry Quinn, and was published by Iron Crown Enterprises in 1989 as a 64-page book.

Reception
Oliver Johnson reviewed Journey to the Magic Isle for Games International magazine, and gave it 2 1/2 stars out of 5, and stated that "Like the American college campus this University resembles, here are plenty of opportunities for the unwitting to get zapped, particularly by a lich lord, the mad professor of the set."

References

Role-playing game supplements introduced in 1989
Rolemaster supplements
Shadow World (role-playing game)